Piao Meiji (born 27 December 1957) is a Chinese speed skater. She competed in the women's 3000 metres at the 1980 Winter Olympics.

References

External links
 

1957 births
Living people
Chinese female speed skaters
Olympic speed skaters of China
Speed skaters at the 1980 Winter Olympics
Place of birth missing (living people)